Aljoscha Thron (born 15 June 1987) is a German former professional tennis player.

Thron won a Junior Davis Cup title with Germany in 2003, as a teammate of Mischa Zverev and Matthias Bachinger. He was a boys' doubles semi-finalist at the 2005 French Open, partnering Kim Sun-yong.

On the ATP Tour, Thron made singles main draws at the 2005 Stuttgart Open and 2005 Ho Chi Minh City Open.

Thron, a qualified medical doctor, is the agent/manager of WTA Tour player Angelique Kerber and since 2020 has been the tournament director of the Bad Homburg Open.

References

External links
 
 

1987 births
Living people
German male tennis players
German sports agents